Inka Paqcha (Quechua Inka Inca, phaqcha, locally paqcha, waterfall, "Inca waterfall", also spelled Incapaccha) is a mountain in the Andes of Peru, about  high. It is located in the Ayacucho Region, Lucanas Province, Carmen Salcedo District. Inka Paqcha lies northwest of Inka Pallanka where the archaeological site of Quriwayrachina is situated.

References 

Mountains of Peru
Mountains of Ayacucho Region